Karlton Hester (born February 11, 1949) is an American, performer, composer, scholar, and educator.

Biography
Hester earned his B.M. at University of Texas at El Paso, his M.A. in Music Education from San Francisco State University, and his Ph.D. in composition from the City University of New York Graduate Center. He formally studied flute with Harry Nelsova and Paul Renzi, saxophone with Frank Chase and Bill Tremble, composition with Bruce Saylor and Robert Starer, and improvisation with Joe Henderson and John Handy. He began his career as a studio musician and music educator in Los Angeles and would later serve as the Herbert Gussman Director of Jazz Studies at Cornell University from 1990 to 2000. At Cornell, Hester directed the Traditional and Experimental Lab Ensembles and coordinated university festivals and conferences that included a diverse array of “jazz” and African artists including Jaki Byard, John Handy, Joe Henderson, Cecil Taylor, McCoy Tyner, Toshiko Akiyoshi, Stanley Turrentine, Louis Jordan, Buddy Collette, Dr. Donald Byrd, Dr. Billy Taylor, Randy Weston, Charles Lloyd, Geri Allen, Benny Powell, Charles Tolliver, Steve Turre, Sam Rivers, Thomas Mapfumo, George E. Lewis, Roscoe Mitchell, Hotep Galeta, Victor Goines, Akua Dixon, Mamadou Diabate, Samite Mulondo, Cecilia Smith, Phil Bowler, Adela Dalto, Pamela Wise, and Nick Mathis. As of 2000 Hester directs the "jazz" program at UC Santa Cruz and is a Professor of Music in the Music Department.

Hester is the founder and director of the San Francisco Fillmore Jazz Preservation Big Band and Hesterian Musicism. Hester's music involves a synthesis of Afrocentric and Western tonal, modal, quartal, serial, and electronic elements into an expressive voice that defies simple categorization as either premeditated or spontaneous composition. Hester's Ph.D. dissertation is titled "The Melodic and Polyrhythmic Development of John Coltrane's Spontaneous Compositions in a Racist Society," and the music of John Coltrane has been a lasting influence on his work. He coined the term musicism  to “represent the creative process by which musicians, visual artists and poets, through the merging of composition and performance, produce new art forms.” This interdisciplinary approach is realized in projects such as “Three Bodies” where Hester collaborated with astrophysicist Greg Laughlin and dancer Ted Warburton to create a multimedia performance that offers a “solution” to the three-body problem. Hester has been the recipient of composer fellowships, grants, and commissions from the National Endowment of the Arts, New York Foundation for the Arts, New England Council of the Arts, ASCAP, and the William Grant Still Foundation. He served as the vice president of the International Society for Improvised Music (2008-2018) and is founding director of Interdisciplinary Artists Aggregation, Inc. (1970–present). Hester is a Gold Medal winner of a Global Music Award for Experimental Jazz in December 2017, for his 2016 album Trans-Cultural Musicism. Hester is currently the director and member of the principal faculty for the University of California, Santa Cruz Digital Arts and New Media (DANM) MFA program.

Discography
 1981: Karlton Hester and the Contemporary Jazz Art Movement (Hesteria Records)
 1982: Hesterian Musicism (Hesteria Records)
 1988: Dances Purely for the Sake of Love (Hesteria Records)
 1998: Musicism for the Sake of Love (Hesteria Records)
 1998: Sacred Musicism (Hesteria Records)
 1998: Retrospective: Cornell University Lab Ensembles & Guest Artists 1991-1998 (Hesteria Records)
 1998: Hesterian Liberation (Hesteria Records)
 1999: Reconstructive Musicism (Hesteria Records)
 2000: Harmonious Soul Scenes 2000 (Hesteria Records)
 2006: Musicism for Your Imagination (Hesteria Records)
 2006: Twentieth Century Musicism (Hesteria Records)
 2006: Live at Herbst Theatre with the Fillmore Jazz Preservation Big Band (Hesteria Records)
 2007: Divine Particle's Vision (Hesteria Records)
 2008: Sixth Sense - Stillness (Hesteria Records/Blue Cliff Records)
 2015: Trans-cultural Musicism (Hesteria Records)
 2017: Divine Consanguinity Ritual (Hesteria Records)
 2018: Hip-Hop Hesteria (Hesteria Records)
 2018: Quantum Elders Ballet (Hesteria Records/Centaur Records)
 2021: Quantum Elders Consciousness Vaccine (Hesteria Records/BluRay video)
 2022: Quantum Elders Consciousness Vaccine (Centaur Records/CD)

Books

 1997: The Melodic and Polyrhythmic Development of John Coltrane's Spontaneous Compositions in a Racist Society (Edwin Mellen Press)
 2000: From Africa to Afrocentric Innovations Some Call "Jazz" (SUNY Press)
 2009: Bigotry and the Afrocentric Jazz Evolution 4th Edition (Cognella Publishing)
 2010: Exploratory Musicism: Ideas for Spontaneous Composition (Cognella Publishing)
 2011: Survey of African Music (Cognella Publishing)
 2016: African Roots of the Jazz Evolution (Cognella Publishing)
 2019: Jazz Nucleus of Global Fission (Kendall Hunt Publishing)

References

Further References
 (September 1983). "Review of Hesterian Musicism." Downbeat Magazine. p. 43
 (January 1983). "Review of Karlton Hester's Contemporary Jazz Art Movement." Cadence Magazine. p. 38
 (May 1983). "Review of Hesterian Musicism." Cadence Magazine. p. 42
 Bivins, Jason. (January 2009). "Review of Divine Particle's Vision." Cadence Magazine. p. 120-121
 Elcombe, Chris. (March 2010). "Review of Stillness: Improvisations 2008." The Strad. p. 95
 Loewy, Steven. (August 2001). "Review of Harmonious Soul Scenes 2000." Cadence Magazine. p. 101-102
 Soergel, Brian. (April 2007). "Review of Live at Herbst Theatre." Jazz Times. p. 89-90
 Watrous, Peter. (April 1989). "Review of Dances Purely for the Sake of Love." Musician'' p. 90

External links 

American jazz musicians
American composers
Living people
Cornell University faculty
1949 births
University of California, Santa Cruz faculty
San Francisco State University alumni
Graduate Center, CUNY alumni